The 1931 Arizona State Bulldogs football team was an American football team that represented Arizona State Teachers College (later renamed Arizona State University) in the Border Conference during the 1931 college football season. In their second season under head coach Ted Shipkey, the Bulldogs compiled a 6–2 record (3–1 against conference opponents), won the conference championship, and outscored their opponents by a combined total of 169 to 66. The team captain was fullback Horace Smitheran.  The Bulldogs finished 4–1 at home and 2–1 on the road. Home games were played at Irish Field in Tempe, Arizona.

Schedule

Roster
The usual Arizona State lineup included left end Wilburn Dick, left tackle Cecil McCullar, left guard Earl McCullar, center Reid Calicoat, right guard Paul Griffin, right tackle Don Pace, right end Bob Smith, quarterback Howard "Curley" Blount, halfbacks Norris Steverson and Bill Baxter, and fullback Horace Smitheran. 

Bob Adams, Guideo Cislaghi, Norman Clements, Ben Cole, Anson Cooper, and Howard Curry were also on the roster.

Awards and honors
Halfback Norris Steverson earned Associated Press (AP) All-American honorable mention honors for the 1931 football season.

Steverson, right guard Paul Griffin, and left end Dick Wilburn earned All-Southern Conference honors for the 1931 campaign.

References

Arizona State
Arizona State Sun Devils football seasons
Border Conference football champion seasons
Arizona State Sun Devils football